Spiritech is the third full-length studio album by the Australian progressive metal band, Alchemist. It was released in 1997 by Australian label Thrust and distributed by Shock Records. A promotional music video for the song "Road to Ubar" was released. "Spiritechnology" samples Ronald Reagan speaking on extraterrestrial life and its possible effect on religion, while "Chinese Whispers" has become popular at live shows. The album has received very positive reviews, with Eduardo Rivadavia from Allmusic suggesting it is "possibly the greatest space metal album since Voivod's landmark Nothingface, adding that Alchemist "meshed [death metal] seamlessly with progressive rock, psychedelia, Middle Eastern nuances, and even native Australian aboriginal music". The album's lyrics tend to explore the relationship between human technology and its impact on nature, and the possibility of extraterrestrial life.

The first five tracks from Spiritech later appeared on the Embryonics compilation album.

Track listing

Credits
 Adam Agius − vocals,  guitar, keyboards
 Rodney Holder − drums
 John Bray − bass guitar
 Roy Torkington − guitar, illustrations
 John Hresc − Engineering at Rocking Horse Studios, Byron Bay, New South Wales, November 1996
 Alchemist  and D.W. Norton − Production
 D.W. Norton − Mixing at Backbeach Studios, Victoria (Australia), March 1997
 Sally Moore − Design

1997 albums
Alchemist (band) albums